Colonel Sir Richard Dawnay Martin-Bird  (19 July 1910 – 3 December 1992) was a British Army officer who was Vice-Chairman of the Territorial, Auxiliary and Volunteer Reserve Association.

Martin-Bird was educated at Charterhouse School and worked in the family business after leaving school. On 29 April 1939 he was commissioned into a Territorial Army battalion of the Manchester Regiment. During the Second World War he served with the regiment in Malta, the Middle East and Italy. Following the war, on 1 May 1947 he was promoted to lieutenant-colonel and took command of the 8th Battalion of the Manchester Regiment. He was awarded the Efficiency Decoration on 3 November 1950. In 1953 Martin-Bird was promoted to colonel and took command of 127th (Manchester) Brigade, retiring from the Army in 1956.

He was made an Aide-de-Camp to Elizabeth II in June 1961 and became a Deputy Lieutenant for Lancashire in August 1964. In 1969 he was made honorary colonel of his former battalion. He was made a Commander of the Order of the British Empire in the 1971 New Year Honours and a Knight Bachelor in the 1975 Birthday Honours in recognition of his work in the Territorial, Auxiliary and Volunteer Reserve Association. Martin-Bird served as High Sheriff of Greater Manchester in 1976. He was a Director and Chairman of Yates's and was President of the Wine and Spirit Trade Association between 1978 and 1979.

References

1910 births
1992 deaths
British Army personnel of World War II
Commanders of the Order of the British Empire
Deputy Lieutenants of Lancashire
High Sheriffs of Greater Manchester
Knights Bachelor
Manchester Regiment officers
People educated at Charterhouse School